Frank E. Kirby (July 1, 1849 – August 25, 1929) was a naval architect in the Detroit, Michigan (United States) area in the early 20th century. He is widely regarded as one of the greatest naval architects in American history.

On June 2, 1900, during the testimony of Mr. Gardiner C. Sims, Superintending Engineer, Army Transport Service, New York City, for the House Inquiry into the Transport Service between San Francisco and the Philippine Islands, the question was asked ...

Q. Who is Mr. Kirby, and why should you have had any talk with him about the ship?—A. He is a successful marine engineer of national reputation. He prepared plans and specifications for the refitting of the Grant, Sherman, Sheridan, Logan, and Thomas, and his precedents I am following as carefully as possible. He is at present engaged in the practice of his profession on the lakes, and he is consulting engineer, you might call it, of the transport branch of the Quartermaster's Department.

As the questioning continued, it was asked ...

Q. Does Mr. Kirby still continue to act as consulting engineer in regard to refitting of the transports?—A. Yes, sir; he did on the plans for refitting the Kilpatrick and Buford, but since I have been here he has never been connected directly with the department.

Q. How is that arrived at?—A. Through the office of the Quartermaster-General. Colonel Bird (Charles F. Bird, Quartermaster in Charge of Ocean Transportation, San Francisco, California) stated he desired to have Mr. Kirby go over the plans where repairs are very large.
  
And two days later, during his testimony, Col. F. B. Jones, General Superintendent, Army Transport Service, New York City, said ...

To refer again to the refitting of transports. The Grant, Sherman, Sheridan, and Relief were refitted before my connection with the service. The Thomas and Logan were started soon afterwards, and I think the suggestion came from the Quartermaster-General's Office that we would employ Mr. Kirby, an expert marine architect, a man who is consulted by many shipowners and ship associations as an authority on ship construction. I was, of course, more than glad to have him assigned to that work and knew that the proper thing had been done in order that the best results might be obtained.

Kirby mostly specialized in paddle-wheel and steamship design. Perhaps his most famous vessel, Tashmoo, was a paddle-wheeler launched on New Year's Eve, 1899. She was constructed by the Detroit Shipbuilding Company in Wyandotte, Mich., for the White Star Steamship Co. of Detroit. The 306-foot vessel made her maiden voyage on June 9, 1900. She would become one of the best known - and most beloved - excursion steamers on the Great Lakes.

Kirby also is well-renowned for his design of the "Bob-Lo boats" - the Columbia and the Ste. Claire. Boblo Island was a major amusement park destination for residents of southeast Michigan (and southern Ontario, Canada) throughout most of the twentieth century. He is also considered the father of modern ice-breaking technology. He designed the D&C Navigation Co.’s armada of stately night boats, including the City of Detroit III.

Kirby designs 
 Steamer Canadiana
 Steamer Chief Wawatam
 Steamer City of Detroit III
 Steamer City of Erie
 Steamer Columbia
 Steamer Greater Detroit (1924)
 Steamer Greater Buffalo (1924) - rebuilt in 1942 as a training aircraft carrier, which trained a future US President, George H. W. Bush
 Steamer Put-In-Bay
 Steamer Ste. Claire 
 Steamer Tashmoo
 Steamer Washington Irving

References

External links 

 Frank E. Kirby (Michigan Transportation History)

Boat and ship designers
1849 births
1929 deaths
Architects from Detroit